Still Blowin' is the eighteenth studio album by American rapper Too Short. It was released on April 6, 2010 via Too Short's independent label Dangerous Music. The album features guest appearances by Birdman, Jazze Pha, among others.

Background
The album is available online only. Lil Jon was originally supposed to be featured on the album, but did not make the final cut although he still produced for the album.

Reception

Critical reception
HipHopDX gave the album a 3.5 out of 5 rating calling the album "one of Too Short's best." Other critics did not receive Too $hort's album as kindly, however.

Commercial performance
The album appeared on one chart, the Billboard Top R&B/Hip-Hop Albums, peaking at number 70. It was the only week that the album was on any chart.

Track listing

Charts

References

2010 albums
Too Short albums
Albums produced by Lil Jon
Albums produced by Jazze Pha